Poimeniko is a village and a community in the municipality of Didymoteicho in the eastcentral Evros regional unit, Greece. It is 2 km east of Sitochori, 3 km southwest of Ampelakia, 13 km southwest of Orestiada and 15 km northwest of Didymoteicho town centre. In 2011 its population was 343. Its elevation is 120 m. It is situated between farmlands, in an area with low hills.

Population

See also

List of settlements in the Evros regional unit

External links
Poimeniko at the GTP Travel Pages

Didymoteicho
Populated places in Evros (regional unit)